The Afar Triangle (also called the Afar Depression) is a geological depression caused by the Afar Triple Junction, which is part of the Great Rift Valley in East Africa. The region has disclosed fossil specimens of the very earliest hominins; that is, the earliest of the human clade, and it is thought by some paleontologists to be the cradle of the evolution of humans.

The Awash River is the main waterflow into the region, but it runs dry during the annual dry season, and ends as a chain of saline lakes. The northern part of the Afar Depression is also known as the Danakil Depression. The lowlands are affected by heat, drought, and minimal air circulation, and contain the hottest places (year-round average temperatures) of anywhere on Earth.

The Afar Triangle is bordered as follows (see the topographic map): on the west by the Ethiopian Plateau and escarpment; to the north-east (between it and the Red Sea) by the Danakil block; to the south by the Somali Plateau and escarpment; and to the south-east by the Ali-Sabieh block (adjoining the Somali Plateau).

Many important fossil localities exist in the Afar region, including the Middle Awash region and the sites of Hadar, Dikika, and Woranso-Mille. These sites have produced specimens of the earliest (fossil) hominins and of human tool culture, as well as many fossils of various flora and fauna.

Environment

Dallol in the Danakil Depression is one of the hottest places year-round anywhere on Earth.

The Awash River, flowing north-eastward through the southern part of the Afar Region, provides a narrow green belt which enables life for the flora and fauna in the area and for the Afars, the nomadic people living in the Danakil Desert. About  from the Red Sea the Awash ends in a chain of salt lakes, where its waterflow evaporates as quickly as it is supplied. Some  of the Afar Depression is covered by salt deposits, and mining salt is a major source of income for many Afar groups.

The Afar Depression biome is characterized as desert scrubland. Vegetation is mostly confined to drought-resistant plants such as small trees (e.g. species of the dragon tree), shrubs, and grasses. Wildlife includes many herbivores such as Grévy's zebra, Soemmerring's gazelle, beisa and, notably, the last viable population of African wild ass (Equus africanus somalicus).

Birds include the ostrich, the endemic Archer's lark, the secretary bird, Arabian and Kori bustards, Abyssinian roller, and crested francolin. In the southern part of the plain lies the Mille-Serdo Wildlife Reserve.

The Afar Triangle is a cradle source of the earliest hominins. It contains a paleo-archaeological district that includes the Middle Awash region and numerous prehistoric sites of fossil hominin discoveries, including: the hominids and possible hominins, Ardi, or Ardipithecus ramidus, and Ardipithecus kadabba, see below; the Gawis cranium hominin from Gona; several sites of the world's oldest stone tools; Hadar, the site of Lucy, the fossilized specimen of Australopithecus afarensis; and Dikika, the site of the fossilized child Selam, an australopithecine hominin.

In 1994, near the Awash River in Ethiopia, Tim D. White found the then-oldest known human ancestor: 4.4 million-year-old Ar. ramidus.  A fossilized almost complete skeleton of a female hominin which he named "Ardi", it took nearly 15 years to safely excavate, preserve, and describe the specimen and to prepare publication of the event.

Geology

The Afar Depression is the product of a tectonic triple-rifts junction (the Afar Triple Junction), where the spreading ridges forming the Red Sea and the Gulf of Aden emerge on land and meet the East African Rift. The conjunction of these three plates of Earth's crust is near Lake Abbe. The Afar Depression is one of two places on Earth where a mid-ocean ridge can be studied on land, the other being Iceland.

The immediate consequences are recurring sequences of earthquakes with deep fissures in the terrain hundreds of metres long, and the valley floor sinking broadly across the depression. During September and October 2005 some 163 earthquakes of magnitudes greater than 3.9 and a volcanic eruption occurred within the Afar rift at the Dabbahu and Erta Ale volcanoes.

Related eruptions have taken place in Teru and Aura woredas. The rift has recently been recorded by means of three-dimensional laser mapping.

The region's salt deposits were created over time as water from the Red Sea periodically flooded the depression and evaporated; the most recent such flood was roughly 30,000 years ago.
Over the next millions of years, geologists expect erosion and the Red Sea to breach the highlands surrounding the Afar Depression and flood the valley. Geologists predict that in about 10 million years the whole  length of the East African Rift will be submerged, forming a new ocean basin as large as today's Red Sea, and separating the Somali Plate and the Horn of Africa from the rest of the continent.

The floor of the Afar Depression is composed of lava, mostly basalt. One of Earth's five lava lakes, Erta Ale is found here, as well as Dabbahu Volcano.  It has been proposed that the Afar Depression is underlain by a mantle plume, a great upwelling of mantle that melts to yield basalt as it approaches the surface.

See also

 in Djibouti
 (with link directory)
 (with images)
The  who inhabit the region

References

Citations

Sources 

 
 Includes a photo essay of the region and its geologic changes.

 
 Jon Kalb: Adventures in the Bone Trade. The Race to Discover Human Ancestors in Ethiopia's Afar Depression. Copernicus Books, New York 2001,

External links
 The Ethiopian state of Afar: Topography and Climate
  Photos of Afars and Danakil
 Photos of Erta Ale, Hotsprings at Dallol and Danakil
 Huge collection of (3000) photos from different expeditions in the Dallol, Erta Ale and Danakil regions
  Photos of Afar Depression: between Ethiopia and Djibouti
  Web site of Main Ethiopian Rift
Science news: Death of a Continent, Birth of an Ocean

Landforms of Djibouti
Landforms of Eritrea
Landforms of Ethiopia
Afar Region
Cenozoic rifts and grabens
Landforms of Africa
Endorheic basins of Africa
Great Rift Valley